"Faith" (stylized as "FAITH") is the single by Japanese singer-songwriter Rina Aiuchi. It was released on 11 April 2001 through Giza Studio, as the lead single from her second studio album Power of Words. The song served as the theme song to the Japanese television show Wonderful. The song reached number eight in Japan and has sold 63,510 copies nationwide.

Track listing

Charts

Certification and sales

|-
! scope="row"| Japan (RIAJ)
| 
| 63,510
|-
|}

Release history

References

2001 singles
2001 songs
J-pop songs
Songs written by Aika Ohno
Song recordings produced by Daiko Nagato
Songs written by Rina Aiuchi